The common leaf-toed gecko (Hemidactylus laevis) is a species of gecko. It is endemic to Somaliland. Despite its vernacular name, it is very rare.

References

Endemic fauna of Somalia
Hemidactylus
Reptiles of Somalia
Reptiles described in 1901
Taxa named by George Albert Boulenger